The 2012 Aaron's 312 was the 8th race of the 2012 NASCAR Nationwide Series and the 21st holding of this event. The race was held at Talladega Superspeedway in Lincoln, Alabama. In the end, Joey Logano won the race in a close finish with his Cup Series teammate Kyle Busch as Logano beat Busch by .034 seconds. But this race became notable for it being a wreckfest and for a terrible crash by Eric McClure that left McClure with a concussion.

Background

The track, Talladega Superspeedway, is one of six  superspeedways to hold NASCAR races, the others being Daytona International Speedway, Auto Club Speedway, Indianapolis Motor Speedway, Pocono Raceway and Michigan International Speedway. The track's turns are banked at thirty-three degrees, while the front stretch, the location of the finish line, is banked at 16.5 degrees. The back stretch has a two-degree banking. Talladega Superspeedway can seat up to 143,231 people.

Entry List
(R) denotes rookie driver
(i) denotes driver who is ineligible for series driver points

Qualifying
Elliott Sadler won the pole after qualifying was rained out.

* - T. J. Bell had to start at the rear of the field due to adjustments after impound.

Race
Pole sitter Elliott Sadler led the first lap of the race. On lap 5, Sadler lost the lead to Kevin Harvick when Sadler and his drafting partner Joey Logano switched positions. On lap 6, Austin Dillon took the lead. On lap 8, James Buescher took the lead from Dillon. Kurt Busch took the lead on lap 14 followed by Joey Logano on lap 15 and Elliott Sadler on lap 16. Kyle Busch took the lead on lap 18 but lost it on the next lap to James Buescher. On lap 21, the first caution flew when Johanna Long's engine blew and she laid fluid on the racetrack. Kyle Busch won the race off of pit road which made him the race leader. On the restart on lap 26, Dale Earnhardt Jr. took the lead from Kyle Busch with a push by Joe Nemechek. Earnhardt lost the lead to Logano on the next lap of the race. The second caution flew on lap 29 for a 5 car crash on the frontstretch. It started when Brian Scott got turned by Kurt Busch in the tri-oval and Scott turned into Jason Bowels and collected Kurt Busch, Josh Richards, and Morgan Shepherd. Some drivers pitted while others stayed out and Dale Earnhardt Jr. was the leader on the restart on lap 35. But Jr. quickly lost the lead to Logano as Logano pitted under caution. Logano lost the lead to Mike Bliss on lap 42 but Logano got it back on lap 44. Dale Earnhardt Jr. took the lead on lap 47 from Logano. Joe Nemechek took the lead from Jr. on lap 52 followed by Mike Wallace on the next lap but Jr. got it back on lap 54. On lap 63, the third caution flew for a 3 car crash on the frontstretch involving Eric McClure, John Wes Townley, and Brad Sweet. Austin Dillon won the race off of pit road making him the race leader. Dillon got passed by Cole Whitt on the restart as Whitt had a push by his boss at JR Motorsports in Dale Earnhardt Jr. Kenny Wallace took the lead on lap 71 followed by Dale Earnhardt Jr. on the next lap. Elliott Sadler took the lead on lap 73 of the race. Ryan Truex took the lead with 43 laps to go followed by Dale Earnhardt Jr. the next lap. With 40 laps to go, Danica Patrick took the lead from Jr. but Jr. took it back on the next lap. With 37 laps to go, Kevin Harvick took the lead from Dale Earnhardt Jr. With 36 laps to go, the fourth caution flew when Josh Richards cut a tire and spun in turn 2. During that Caution period, Timmy Hill was taken out of his car and replaced by Blake Koch in his #41 car. Hill had not been feeling well for the last day so he was taken out during the caution period. Kevin Harvick won the race off of pit road which made him the race leader with 30 laps to go. On the restart, Joey Logano took the lead from Harvick.

Final Laps
With 29 laps to go, Kyle Busch took the lead from Joey Logano. Busch was also able to hold off the pack behind him and never lost the lead. It looked like Busch was gonna win the race depending on how the last few laps went. Unfortunately for Busch, with 9 laps to go the 5th caution flew when Mike Bliss spun in turn 3. The caution turned things around as cars were now all bunched back together and all of them were going to race hard for positions. The race restarted with 4 laps to go and Busch kept his lead with a push by Joe Nemechek. Unfourtantley again for Busch, the 6th caution flew on the same lap when Mike Wallace and Danny Efland crashed in turn 4. The wreck would set up 3 attempts of a green-white-checker finish.

On the restart, Nemechek got out in front by half a car length but Busch was not giving up as Busch was getting pushed by Brad Keselowski and Nemechek was getting pushed by Kevin Harvick. Michael Annett tried to peak through the middle down the backstretch with a push by Joey Logano. Annett made contact with Keselowski then Annett turned down and into Kevin Harvick turning Harvick around collecting Keselowski. Keselowski spun down and collected Annett and Austin Dillon. Behind them, Eric McClure checked up to avoid the wreck but got hit in the right front by Kurt Busch and McClure's car turned left into Jeffery Earnhardt and the two went spinning towards the inside wall. McClure's car spun down the racetrack and pounded the inside wall head on at nearly full speed which made his car bounce. The wreck collected a total of 11 cars as the cars involved were Austin Dillon, Danica Patrick, Eric McClure, Jeffery Earnhardt, Joey Logano, Tayler Malsam, Brad Keselowski, Robert Richardson Jr., Kevin Harvick, Blake Koch, and Michael Annett. Everyone was ok but Eric McClure was still stuck inside his car. Rescue crews began to surround his car attempting to get him out as the race was red flagged. It took the crews about 10 minutes to get McClure out of his car. The crews ended up cutting the rollcage to give them a better chance to assist him. McClure was carried on a stretcher from his car to an ambulance and got flown to University of Alabama Hospital in Birmingham, Alabama for further evaluation. McClure had suffered a concussion and internal bruises. But thankfully, McClure survived the crash. The race was red flagged for over 15 minutes for crews attempting to get McClure out of his car and to repair the SAFER barrier where McClure hit. The race restarted. On the second attempt, Busch kept his lead over Logano. Behind them down the backstretch, Sam Hornish Jr. got hooked by Justin Allgaier and turned into Joe Nemechek. But everyone saved it and no caution was thrown. 4 cars broke away in tandems with Busch getting pushed by Joey Logano, and behind them was Cole Whitt getting pushed by Ricky Stenhouse Jr. On the final lap, Whitt and Stenhouse attempted to gain ground on Busch and Logano but could not do it. In the tri-oval, Logano attempted to pull to the outside of Busch and got side by side with him. Logano beat Busch by .034 seconds to take home the win. Coming to the checkered, Danica Patrick came down into Sam Hornish Jr. and Hornish and Patrick went into the outside wall. After they took the checkered, Patrick turned Hornish into the outside wall in turn 1 as a show of displeasure of how she was raced on the final lap. Kyle Busch, Ricky Stenhouse Jr., Cole Whitt, and Dale Earnhardt Jr. rounded out the top 5 while Kurt Busch, James Buescher, Justin Allgaier, Kenny Wallace, and Elliott Sadler rounded out the top 10.

Race results

References

2012 in sports in Alabama
NASCAR races at Talladega Superspeedway
May 2012 sports events in the United States